The 1991 World Rowing Championships were World Rowing Championships that were held from 19 to 25 August 1991 in Vienna, Austria. The regatta was held on the New Danube.

Medal summary
The finals were raced on Saturday and Sunday, 24 and 25 August.

Men's events

Women's events

Medal table

References

World Rowing Championships
World Rowing Championships
Rowing Championships
Rowing competitions in Austria
1991 in Austrian sport
Sports competitions in Vienna
1990s in Vienna
August 1991 sports events in Europe